Luis Miguel Concepción Montiel (born October 6, 1985) is a Panamanian professional boxer.

Professional career

His nickname is "El Nica", the southpaw resides in the capital of Panama. His professional record includes 24 fights: 22 wins (17 knockouts), and 2 losses. He won the WBA Interim Flyweight Title by TKO against Mexican Omar Salado on September 5, 2009.  He was promoted to full WBA Champion after reigning Champion Daiki Kameda relinquished his title in 2011. He lost the WBA Flyweight Title to Hernan Márquez by TKO in the 11th round.

Concepcion was slated to defend his WBA super flyweight title against Kal Yafai on 10 December, 2016. Concepcion failed to make weight for the fight twice, leading to the WBA stripping him of the title a day before the fight. The title was vacant and only Yafai was eligible to win it with an eventual win. Yafai managed to secure the win with a boxing masterclass, winning on all three scorecards.

In his next fight, he knocked out Luis de la Rosa in the second round to secure the win.

Next, Concepcion was scheduled to fight Iran Diaz. Despite being the underdog, Diaz got a shocking unanimous decision win against Concepcion.

In a bid to get his career back on track, Concepcion fought Colombian Luis Carrillo in his homecountry of Panama, on 24 October, 2017. Concepcion managed to secure the much needed win via a second-round knockout.

Next, Concepcion fought unbeaten super flyweight Andrew Moloney. Concepcion lost the fight in the tenth round via TKO. Moloney was dominant from the opening bell, with Concepcion having some success in the latter rounds, but not nearly enough to make a difference in the fight.

Professional boxing record

See also
List of flyweight boxing champions
List of super-flyweight boxing champions
List of Panamanians

References

External links

Luis Concepcion - Profile, News Archive & Current Rankings at Box.Live

1985 births
Living people
Flyweight boxers
Super-flyweight boxers
World flyweight boxing champions
World super-flyweight boxing champions
World Boxing Association champions
Sportspeople from Panama City
Panamanian male boxers